The Macau-Guangdong Union, UMG for short, is a political party in the Chinese Special Administrative Region of Macau.

In the 2009 legislative election, the party won 7.30 percent of the popular vote and 1 of the 12 popularly elected seats.

Elected members
 Mak Soi Kun, 2009–present
 Zheng Anting, 2013–present

References

Political parties in Macau
Conservative parties in China